The Matra-Simca MS660 is a Group 6 prototype race car introduced in 1969 for the International Championship for Makes. The MS660 replaced the previous Matra-Simca MS650.

Racing History

1970
The team entered three cars for the 24 Hours of Le Mans with Jean-Pierre Beltoise and Henri Pescarolo in the MS660, Jack Brabham/Francois Cevert and Patrick Depailler/Jean-Pierre Jabouille/Tim Schenken were both in the older Matra-Simca MS650 but all three cars retired with engine failure.

In the International Championship for Makes, Matra had scored four points, earning it fourth place in the championship, all the points were scored in the MS650.

1971

The first race of the season was the 1971 1000 km Buenos Aires. Matra entered one car for Beltoise/Jabouille, but their car retired after it ran out of fuel. Beltoise pushed the car back to the pits only for race leader Ignazio Giunti in his Ferrari to run into the back of the disabled MS660. Both cars caught fire and Giunti was killed. As a result of the accident, Beltoise's international racing licence was suspended for some time. The team didn't enter another race until the 24 Hours of Le Mans with Beltoise and Chris Amon but it retired with a fuel system failure.

In the International Championship for Makes, Matra had scored no points.

1972
The team entered the 24 Hours of Le Mans with Jabouille and David Hobbs with an updated version of the MS660 known as the MS660C but it retired with a transmission issue. The car was replaced by the Matra-Simca MS670 from 1973.

In the International Championship for Makes, Matra had scored no points.

Complete International Championship for Makes results

References

Racing cars